Bredeck is a small village in the municipality Herzebrock-Clarholz, in the district of Gütersloh, North Rhine-Westphalia, Germany.

Villages in North Rhine-Westphalia